Antonino "Ninni" Cassarà (7 May 1947 – 6 August 1985) was an Italian policeman assassinated by the Cosa Nostra.

Life
Born in Palermo on 7 May 1947, he was Commissioner in Reggio Calabria and then in Trapani, where he learned about Giovanni Falcone. He was then promoted and sent to Palermo where he served as deputy chief of the Judicial police. In 1982 he worked on the streets of Palermo together with the agent Calogero Zucchetto, in the context of Cosa Nostra's inquiries. On one of these occasions Cassarà and Zucchetto recognized the two top killers Pino Greco and Mario Prestifilippo, but they could not arrest them because they fled.
Among the numerous operations he took part in, many of which together with Commissioner Giuseppe Montana, there is the famous Pizza Connection operation in collaboration with U.S. police forces. Cassarà was a close associate of Giovanni Falcone and the so-called Antimafia pool of the  Republic Prosecutor's Office of Palermo, and his investigations contributed to the groundwork of the first Maxi Trial. Married and father of three children, he was killed by the Mafia in 1985, at the age of 38.

Assassination
On 6 August 1985, he was returning home via the Viale della Croce Rossa 81 in Palermo in an Alfetta and escorted by two agents. He exited the car and reached the front door of his home when a group of nine hitmen with AK-47 rifles, who were lurking in a construction building, opened fire. Agent Roberto Antiochia, who had come out of the car to open the door for Cassarà, was struck by shots and fell to the floor in front of the entrance door. Natale Mondo, the other escort agent, remained unharmed succeeding in taking cover under the car (but was later killed on 14 January 1988). Cassarà, hit by the killers almost simultaneously with Antiochia, died inside the entrance hall in the arms of his wife Laura, who saw the ambush with their daughter from the balcony of their home. Antonino Cassarà is buried in the Sant'Orsola Cemetery in Palermo. After the assassination (or in the meanwhile) his notebook, which was assumed to contain important information, disappeared from his office.

On 17 February 1995, the tribunal of Palermo sentenced life imprisonment to five members of the Cupola (Totò Riina, Bernardo Provenzano, Michele Greco, Bernardo Brusca and Francesco Madonia) in connection of the crime.

See also
List of victims of the Sicilian Mafia
Paolo Borsellino
Rocco Chinnici
Gaetano Costa
Boris Giuliano
Giuseppe Montana
Carlo Alberto Dalla Chiesa
Il Capo dei Capi

References

Italian police officers
People murdered by the Sicilian Mafia
1947 births
1985 deaths
People murdered by the Corleonesi